Sourdeval is a commune in the Manche department in Normandy in north-western France. On 1 January 2016, the former commune of Vengeons was merged into Sourdeval.

Heraldry

Twin towns
It is twinned with Odiham, a village in Hampshire.

See also
Communes of the Manche department

References 

Communes of Manche